Lucie Štěpánková (Lucie Štěpánek) is a Czech actress.

Early life 
She was born 30 July 1981 in Vsetín. She studied at Janáček Conservatory in Ostrava.

Career 
She hosted in Petr Bezruč Theatre Company. From 2001 to 2007, she worked in Východočeské divadlo (East Bohemian Theatre) in Pardubice. She is a member of the theatre ensemble of Divadlo na Vinohradech in Prague. In 2003, she received an award for the best woman's performance at the theatre festival České divadlo (Czech Theatre).

Theatre

Vinohrady Theatre
The Makropulos Affair .... Kristina
Vojcek .... Marie
Transit .... Girl
Adina .... Adina

East Bohemian Theatre 

Ondina .... Ondina
Romeo and Juliet .... Juliet
Vojnarka .... Madlena Vojnarová
Maya .... Millie
Její pastorkyňa .... Jenůfa
Předvečer tříkrálový
Nápadníci trůnu
Three Sisters
Noc na Karlštejně .... Alena
Měsíční běs .... Seta (Best Female Performance in Festival Czech Theatre 2002/03)
The Merchant of Venice .... Jessika
Ještě jednou, pane profesore .... Natasha
Stabat Mater .... Julie
Ledeburské zahrady .... Marie

Other Stage Works 

Doňa Bernarda House, Petr Bezruč Theatre Company
Královské hry, National Moravian-Silesian Theatre

Filmography 
Tři srdce (2007) (TV)
Krvavý Hugo (1997)

References

External links 
Lucie in Divadlo na Vinohradech Website
Interview with Lucie
Czechoslovak Film Database
(Czech Television) 

Living people
1981 births
Czech stage actresses
Czech television actresses
People from Vsetín
Recipients of the Thalia Award
21st-century Czech actresses